The Honiara FA League is an association football competition based in Honiara, Solomon Islands, where all the clubs based in Honiara, played each other in an inaugural league format.

Teams 
List of all teams that participated.
Hana FC
HPF FC
Junior Flamingo FC
K1 United FC
Laugu United FC
Koloale FC
Kossa FC
Makuru FC
Marist FC
Naha F.C.
Rangers FC
Solomon Warriors FC
Sunbeam FC
Zome Mars FC

Winners

References

Football leagues in the Solomon Islands
Honiara